Wertsville is an unincorporated community located along County Route 602 (Wertsville Road) in East Amwell Township of Hunterdon County, New Jersey, United States.

History
The settlement is named for the Werts family, and was known locally as "Werts' Corners".

By 1881, Wertsville had a school, Baptist church, post office, store, shoemaker shop and wagon shop.

Historic district

The Wertsville Historic District is a  historic district encompassing the community along Wertsville and Lindbergh roads. It was added to the National Register of Historic Places on October 5, 2000 for its significance in architecture, commerce, and community planning and development. The district includes 31 contributing buildings. The Amwell Baptist Church was built in 1834 with Greek Revival style, and remodeled in 1884. It is now a residence. The P.V.D. Manners Store was built in 1883 with Italianate style and is now known as Peacock's Country Store.

See also
 National Register of Historic Places listings in Hunterdon County, New Jersey

References

External links
 
 

East Amwell Township, New Jersey
Unincorporated communities in Hunterdon County, New Jersey
Unincorporated communities in New Jersey
National Register of Historic Places in Hunterdon County, New Jersey
Historic districts on the National Register of Historic Places in New Jersey
New Jersey Register of Historic Places